Scouting in Luxembourg  (SiL; formerly Luxembourg Boy Scout Association, LBSA) is a federation of two Scout associations serving Luxembourg. In Luxembourg, Scouting was founded in 1914 and became a member of the World Organization of the Scout Movement in 1922. SiL has a membership of 5,275 Scouts as of 2011.

Members of SiL are:
Fédération Nationale des Eclaireurs et Eclaireuses du Luxembourg (FNEL, interreligious, coed)
Lëtzebuerger Guiden a Scouten (LGS, Catholic, coed)

See also

Bureau de Liaison des Associations Guides du Luxembourg
Wiltz International Scout Centre

References

External links
Official website 

World Organization of the Scout Movement member organizations
Scouting and Guiding in Luxembourg
Youth organizations established in 1945